Rottner is a surname. Notable people with the surname include:

 Jean Rottner (born 1967), French politician
 Mickey Rottner (1919–2011), American basketball player

See also
 Rotner
 Rottier (surname)